A reference price (RP) is the price that a purchaser announces that it is willing to pay for a good or service. It is used by high-volume purchasers to inform suppliers.

RP requires consumers to have access to price and quality information, which is not general practice in many industries. Further, it does not help consumers with urgent needs, cognitive and/or other impairments.

Reference pricing requires sufficient competition. Otherwise, consumers have no choice about providers, who in turn face less pricing pressure. Reference pricing could encourage lower quality.

"Reference price" in this context is distinct from its use in behavioral pricing scholarship. In that literature, a "reference price" refers to a mental standard of comparison or a posted statement of "normal" prices  used to judge whether an offered price is good deal -- as in "Was $100, now $70." Reference prices in this context are related to work by Nobel Prize winner Richard Thaler on "transaction utility" in his theory of mental accounting.

Applications

Health care 
Some insurers use reference pricing to reduce their provider costs. The insurer announces prices that it is willing to pay for specific surgical procedures, pharmaceuticals and other services. If the provider charges a higher price, the patient is responsible for the balance. One study estimated that about 40 percent of health care spending is for services for which patients could shop. Appropriate services include hip and knee replacement, colonoscopy, magnetic resonance imaging (MRI) of the spine, computerized tomography (CT) scan of the head or brain, nuclear stress test of the heart, and echocardiogram because they have relatively uniform protocols and are less likely to experience variation in quality.

In health care, a more common alternative is to limit patients to a specific network of providers who have accepted the pricing and other terms specified by the insurer. RP provides consumers a broader choice of providers. Further, some large employers contract with regional "centers of excellence," such as Cleveland Clinic.

Several countries are using RP, such as external reference pricing, to compare the national drug prices against other countries' or other formulations of a similar therapeutic class.

On May 2, 2014, the Obama administration published its approval for large/self-insured firms to use RP for health care services and to use the price of generic drugs as the RP for other drugs, which would encourage patients to favor generics over non-generics. Costs that exceed the RP are not counted for ACA's out-of-pocket limits.

CalPERS 
In 2011 California Public Employees' Retirement System (CalPERS) adopted reference pricing for 450,000 members. The approach was used for knee and hip replacement surgery, arthroscopy, colonoscopies, cataract removal surgery and other elective procedures. For example, the RP for a knee or hip replacement surgery was $30,000. As before, the patient was responsible for 20 percent of the first $15,000, paying a maximum of $3,000. The insurer covered the next $15,000. However, if the procedure cost $40,000, the patient was responsible for the final $10,000. Initially 41 of the hundreds of hospitals provided knee and hip replacement procedures at or below the RP with acceptable quality. Some hospitals charged more than $100,000. Multiple studies found that patients sought out the lower cost facilities. Prices for knee and hip replacements and cataract surgery fell by an average 20%. Other procedures fell by similar percentages. Many higher price facilities lowered their prices. Quality was apparently unaffected. By contrast, prices paid by employer-sponsored plans rose by about 5.5 percent.

CalPERS reduced cost-sharing for patients who chose a (lower cost) outpatient surgical center, instead of a (higher cost) hospital.

Energy 
The Canadian province of Alberta operates an RP scheme for natural gas. It is a monthly, weighted average of the consumer price in Alberta and a price at the Alberta border, with transporting and marketing adjustments. The system became effective in 1994.

References 

Pricing
Health care reform